The 2019 Turkish Women's Cup is the third edition of the Turkish Women's Cup, an invitational women's football tournament held annually in Turkey. It takes place from 27 February to 5 March 2019.

Format
The eight invited teams were split into two groups to play a round-robin tournament. Points awarded in the group stage follow the standard formula of three points for a win, one point for a draw and zero points for a loss. In the case of two teams being tied on the same number of points in a group, their head-to-head result determine the higher place.

Every team will play each other in the group once with the group-toppers making it to the final. There will also be matches for the third and the fourth slot, the fifth and the sixth slot, and the seventh and the eighth places.

Teams

Squads

The team had to name a final squad of over 20 players, including two or three goalkeepers. Players in the final squad may be replaced for serious injury up to 24 hours prior to kickoff of the team's first match and such replacements do not need to have been named in the preliminary squad.

Group stage

Group A
Times listed are UTC+03:00.

Group B
Times listed are UTC+03:00.

Ranking of teams for placement matches

Placement matches

Seventh place game

Fifth place game

Third place game

Final

Goalscorers

See also

 Women's football in Turkey
 Turkish women in sports
 Women's football

References

External links
 

2019 in women's association football
Women's Cup
February 2019 sports events in Turkey
March 2019 sports events in Turkey
2019
Sport in Antalya
2019 in Turkish women's sport